"100%" is  Mary Kiani's 4th solo single on her label, 1st Avenue Records. The single was released in 1996 and peaked at #23 at the charts. A video for the song was not released.

Track listings and formats

Mary Kiani songs
1996 songs
1996 singles
Songs written by Tim Lever
Songs written by Mike Percy (musician)
Songs written by Pam Sheyne
Mercury Records singles